National Route 434 is a national highway of Japan connecting Shūnan, Yamaguchi and Miyoshi, Hiroshima in Japan, with a total length of 166.9 km (103.71 mi).

References

National highways in Japan
Roads in Hiroshima Prefecture
Roads in Yamaguchi Prefecture